Byaradingka is a town in Paro District in western Bhutan.

References

External links
Satellite map at Maplandia.com

Populated places in Bhutan